Alone Together is a studio album by Catherine Russell. It received a Grammy Award nomination for Best Jazz Vocal Album.

Track listing
"Alone Together"
"Early in the Morning"
"You Turned the Tables On Me"
"He May Be Your Dog But He's Wearing My Collar"
"Shake Down the Stars"
"Is You Is Or Is You Ain't My Baby?"
"You Can't Pull the Over My Eyes"
"I Only Have Eyes For You"
"When Did You Leave Heaven?"
"You're Not the Only Oyster in the Show"

References

External links
 Track By Track, Jazziz

2019 albums
Catherine Russell (singer) albums